Taste of Love (simplified Chinese: 缘之烩) is a Singaporean Chinese modern romance drama about three good friends. It was telecasted on Singapore's free-to-air channel, MediaCorp Channel 8. It made its debut on 22 January 2008 and ended on 22 February 2008. This drama serial consists of 21 episodes, and was screened on every weekday night at 9:00 pm.

Cast

Main cast
Dawn Yeoh 姚懿珊 as Tao le 陶乐
Dai Xiangyu 戴向宇 as Fang You Fang
Michelle Chia 谢韵仪 as Yu Ling Zhi
Chen Hanwei 陈汉玮 as Hu Ying Bang
Candice Liu 刘容嘉 as Ye Yu Tong

Supporting Cast
Jimmy Nah 蓝钦喜 (MC King) as Yu Du Zhong
May Phua as Ding Li Yi 
Ye Shipin as Tao Da Cheng 
Zeng Shao Zhong as Tao Xi 陶喜
Jacqueline Sue as Ye Yu Xin
Zheng Geping 郑各评 as Wang Xue Ren
Chen Shucheng 陈澍城 as Qiang Ge
Tan Xin Yi as Yu Tong (Young)

Synopsis
Tao Le (Dawn Yeoh), Ye Yutong (Candice Liu) and Yu Lingzhi (Michelle Chia) are best friends since young. While Lingzhi is a modern independent lady with many suitors, both Tao Le and Yutong aspire to be great chefs. However, this ambition turned the two friends against each other as the jealous Yutong begins thwarting Tao Le's plan as she tries to revive her grandmother's restaurant.

At the same time, a love triangle develops between Tao Le, Lingzhi, and Fang Youfang (Dai Xiang Yu), a tenant living under Tao Le's roof. The relationship is made complicated when Lingzhi's boss, Hu Yingbang (Chen Hanwei) enters the picture.

What will the future hold for the three friends? Will they overcome their differences and succeed both in career and love?

Trivia
One of the cast members of this drama, Jimmy Nah (MC King), died just 3 weeks before the telecast of this drama. This is his second last drama he has filmed before passing on.

Ratings

External links
Official Website (English Edition)
Official Website (Chinese Edition)
Picture Video (with theme song being the background music)

Singapore Chinese dramas
2008 Singaporean television series debuts
2008 Singaporean television series endings
2000s romantic drama television series